California's 9th State Assembly district is one of 80 California State Assembly districts. It is currently represented by Democrat Jim Cooper of Elk Grove.

District profile 
The district contains a third of the city of Sacramento and its southern suburbs. The district also extends southward towards Stockton, encompassing the main corridor between the two cities.

Sacramento County – 28.0%
 Elk Grove
 Florin
 Galt
 Parkway
 Sacramento – 32.4%

San Joaquin County – 10.3%
 Lodi – ~100.0%

Election results from statewide races

List of Assembly Members
Due to redistricting, the 9th district has been moved around different parts of the state. The current iteration resulted from the 2011 redistricting by the California Citizens Redistricting Commission.

Election results 1992 - present

2020

2018

2016

2014

2012

2010

2008

2006

2004

2002

2000

1998

1996

1994

1992

See also 
 California State Assembly
 California State Assembly districts
 Districts in California

References

External links 
 District map from the California Citizens Redistricting Commission

09
Government of Sacramento County, California
Government of San Joaquin County, California
Lodi, California
Government of Sacramento, California